St. Jakob Arena is an arena in Basel, Switzerland.  It is primarily used for ice hockey and is the home arena of EHC Basel. St. Jakob Arena opened in 2002 and holds 6,700 people.

See also 
St. Jakob-Park

External links 
Basel United Website

Indoor ice hockey venues in Switzerland
Buildings and structures in Basel
Sport in Basel